Ghost Town is a text adventure developed by Adventure International and released in 1980. It is part of the Adventure series of games developed by Scott Adams, preceded by Adventureland, Pirate Adventure, and Strange Odyssey.

Plot
The player searches a Western ghost town for treasure. In addition to the points a player receives when treasures are deposited, bonus points are awarded for doing certain deeds which may or may not be connected to finding treasure.

Reception
The game was reviewed briefly in The Dragon #44 by Mark Herro.  Herro said that this was the toughest game he'd seen so far in the Adventure series.  He also commented that "Scott [Adams] has really outdone himself on this one."

References

External links
Review in Compute!s Guide to Adventure Games

1980 video games
Adventure International games
Apple II games
Atari 8-bit family games
BBC Micro and Acorn Electron games
Commodore 64 games
Dragon 32 games
Single-player video games
TI-99/4A games
TRS-80 games
VIC-20 games
Video games developed in the United States
Western (genre) video games
ZX Spectrum games